= People's Leader =

People's Leader (Chinese: 人民领袖; pinyin: Rénmín Lǐngxiù) is a Chinese honorific title. It may refer to:

- Mao Zedong (1893–1976), Chairman of the Chinese Communist Party and paramount leader of China from 1949 to 1976
- Hua Guofeng (1921–2008), Chairman of the Central Committee of the Chinese Communist Party from October 7, 1976 to June 28, 1981
- Xi Jinping (born 1953), General Secretary of the Chinese Communist Party (paramount leader) since 2012
